The Iberian horse is a designation given to a number of horse breeds native to the Iberian peninsula.  At present, some breeds are officially recognized by the FAO, while other horses believed to be native to the peninsula are not. Likewise, some modern breeds are understood from mitochondrial DNA to be descended from historic landraces, while others have origins outside the Iberian peninsula.  The remaining FAO-recognized breeds are of well-known foreign blood, or are recently developed breeds.

History

Cave paintings show that horses have been present on the Iberian Peninsula as far back as 20,000 to 25,000 BCE.  Iberian horses are thought to be among the oldest types of domesticated horses. DNA studies indicate certain breeds have ancestry that can be traced to wild horses that lived about 6200BCE, in the Early Iberian Neolithic period.  There is a past hypothesis that the Sorraia may have been an ancestor of several modern breeds, and it is possible as their haplotype is found throughout the Iberian horse population, though it is not as frequently found as other mDNA lineages. Thus current evidence suggests they are not as closely related as once thought.  However, the problem is that the Sorraia has endured a major genetic bottleneck since ancient times, and only two DNA founder lineages remain, so it is not possible to determine if certain haplotypes in various breeds descend from other lines now extinct in the Sorraia.

Roman writers mention in Hispania war horses, wild horses, "tieldones" and small "asturcones'" in the north. 

Two distinct phenotypes of Iberian horse were identified in early research: so-called "Celtic" ponies, centered in the Cantabrian Range in the north, and the horses of the south, represented today by the Andalusian and Carthusian, Lusitano, Marismeño and related breeds, many of which have a Baroque horse phenotype. The northern breeds include the Garrano, Pottok, and Asturcon, all of which are considered endangered breeds. 

Throughout history, Iberian horses have been influenced by many different peoples and cultures who occupied Spain, including the Celts, the Carthaginians, the Romans, various Germanic tribes and the Arabs. The Iberian horse was identified as a talented war horse as early as 450 BCE. Mitochondrial DNA studies of the modern horses of the Iberian peninsula and Barb horse of North Africa present convincing evidence that horses crossed the Strait of Gibraltar in both directions and crossbred. It is not possible to determine which of these strains is the older one, and both trace to the Roman era, far earlier than the Muslim conquest of Spain that is commonly assumed to mark the beginning of such crossbreeding.

At one time, the northern Celtic horses were though to have ancestry related to the Exmoor pony of the British Isles, but subsequent Mitochondrial DNA studies revealed that the populations are not closely related until there was some documented admixture between Exmoors and Celtic horses in the early-to-mid 20th century.  If anything, the Iberian breeds are characterized by a "consistent absence of geographical structure".

When the Spanish reached the Americas in the late 15th century, they brought various horses of Iberian ancestry with them. Their descendants have been designated as the Colonial Spanish Horse and have contributed significantly to a number of horse breeds in both North and South America.

In modern times, stallions from outside breeds were crossed on local breeds, such as the Exmoor pony stallions brought to the area, or for example, the heavy Burguete and Jaca Navarra breeds crossed on foreign stallions to create a bigger animal more useful for the horsemeat industry.

In Spain and Portugal, the 1980s marked the start of efforts to bring back several of the Northern Iberian breeds from extinction, some of which were down to a few dozen individuals.  The Cartusian strain of Pure Spanish (Andalusian) horse was also endangered, with a breeding population of about 150 animals.  In 2005, a distinctive primitive, feral breed was identified inside Doñana National Park, the Retuerta horse (Caballo de las retuertas).

See also
List of Iberian horse breeds
 Sable Island horse

References

External links

Report on DNA of Spanish horses
Info on Jaca Navarra (Spanish) (Google translation)

Types of horse
Iberian Peninsula